The Tata Tiago is a city car made by Tata Motors in India since 2016.

Codenamed the "Kite" during development, the Tiago was previously announced as the Tata Zica, with "Zica" short for "zippy car", but it was changed because the launch of the car coincided with the outbreak of Zika virus. Tiago, a common Portuguese masculine name, was picked from suggestions solicited online.

History

Tata Tiago was born as the successor of the previous Tata Bolt, which was nothing but a heavy restyling of Tata Indica Vista. Like the Indica Vista, even the Bolt did not get the desired success and Tata began designing a completely new vehicle (Kite project) of a city car with 5-door body that could boost the sales of the brand in the Indian territory.

The base platform was always the Tata X0 chassis that also adopted the previous Indica and Bolt but was heavily modified and shortened because with the new car Tata Motors wanted to lower the list price as well as the production costs. Also, the engines were all new and the old Fiat 1.2-litre FIRE and 1.3-litre Multijet unit adopted by the previous models were abandoned. With the Tiago, Tata brings to its debut the Revotron and Revotorq three-cylinders designed together with Austria's AVL, a family of modular propellers designed to equip the entire range of the Indian manufacturer.

The Tiago was 3.75 metres long, shorter than the old Tata Bolt, the body has 5 doors. From the Tiago has also been developed a sedan variant called Tata Tigor.

The Tiago is produced only with right hand drive in Tata Motors Sanand plant and is not expected to be imported in Europe.

In September 2018, Tata Motors launched the Tiago NRG in the Indian market, a crossover like trim with a  raised, raw plastic guards for the bumpers and sills, two-tone alloy wheels and a rear bumper shield. The Tiago NRG is sold with both 1.2 petrol and 1.05 diesel engines. in 2021 tata Also Launched facelift version of Tiago NRG.

JTP version 
It was tuned by JT Special Vehicles or JTSV, a joint venture between Tata Motors and Coimbatore-based Jayem Automotives. According to Tata, the car can accelerate from  under 10 seconds. There are also design changes which includes revised front grille, new bumper at front and dual exhaust pipe at the rear.

Facelift (2020) 

The facelifted Tata Tiago was unveiled alongside the Tigor in 2020. It included cosmetic changes along with the BS6-complaint engine update. Also Tata has added some new more colours including Victory yellow which later on Tata has discontinued. In 2022 Tata Also launched the CNG Version named Tiago i-CNG.

Tiago.ev 
The Tata Tiago.ev was launched in 2022. The LR version has a range of 315 km with battery capacity of 24 kWh while the MR version has a certified range of 250 km with a battery capacity of 19.2 kWh. The battery can be charged in 3.6 hours with a normal charger and in 57 min with fast charger. It can go from 0-60 km/h in just 5.7 seconds. It can generate torque up to 114 Nm and power up to 73.75 Bhp.

Safety rating 
In 2020, the Indian manufactured Tiago/Tigor was crash tested in its basic safety specification for the Indian market by the Global NCAP, scoring four stars for adult occupant protection and three stars for child occupant protection. Tiago/Tigor offers dual airbags as standard across all the variants but does not offer side airbags or ESC even as an option. It does not offers ISOFIX anchorages even as an option and does not have three-point seatbelts and head restraints in all seating positions. Its structure was deemed to be incapable of withstanding further loading during the crash test.

References

External links

Official Tata Tiago Website

Cars introduced in 2016
City cars
Front-wheel-drive vehicles
Hatchbacks
Tiago
2010s cars
Global NCAP superminis
Production electric cars